Margaret Elizabeth Carter (born April 9, 1921) is a fictional character appearing in American comic books published by Marvel Comics. She is usually depicted as a supporting character in books featuring Captain America. Created by writer Stan Lee and artist Jack Kirby, she debuted, unnamed, in Tales of Suspense #75 as a World War II love interest of Steve Rogers in flashback sequences. She would later be better known as a relative of Captain America's modern-day significant other, Sharon Carter.

Hayley Atwell portrayed the character in several projects of the Marvel Cinematic Universe from 2011 to 2019, including films, a short film, and television series, before playing alternate versions of the character known as Captain Carter in the animated series What If...? (2021–present) and the film Doctor Strange in the Multiverse of Madness (2022).

Publication history
The character debuted in a single panel (and unnamed) as a wartime love interest of Captain America in Tales of Suspense #75 (March 1966), and then receiving a backstory in #77 (May 1966). She was created by writer Stan Lee and artist Jack Kirby. She appeared again as the older sister of Sharon Carter in Captain America #161 (May 1973). She was later retconned as Sharon's aunt, then later great-aunt, due to the unaging nature of comic book characters (see Captain America vol. 5 #25 (April 2007)). The character has appeared frequently in Captain America stories set during World War II.

Fictional character biography
Dr. Peggy Carter joins the French Resistance as a teenager and becomes a skilled fighter, who serves on several operations alongside Captain America. The two fall in love, but an exploding shell gives her amnesia and she is sent to live with her parents in Virginia.

During the "Original Sin" storyline, it was revealed in 1952 that Peggy Carter worked with Howard Stark and Woody McCord when they investigated an alien ship in Siberia. The three of them worked to keep the alien from being taken by Hydra and had the alien live with Anton Vanko.

In the 1960s, Peggy Carter joined up with S.H.I.E.L.D. for a long tenure.

At the time when Captain America resurfaced in the world, Peggy Carter was taking treatments from Doctor Faustus. When she was rescued by Captain America, she maintained her friendship with him.

Peggy Carter later helped Captain America fight the Secret Empire. She also dealt with his decision to stop being Captain America for a while.

Peggy helps Captain America when her niece Sharon Carter and some S.H.I.E.L.D. Agents went missing while gathering information on the new Grand Director.

Peggy Carter later joined the Avengers' support staff at Avengers Mansion.

During her retirement, Peggy lived in a nursing home and started suffering dementia where she couldn't recognize Sharon. William Burnside later visited Peggy claiming to be the original Captain America. Following her death, S.H.I.E.L.D. erected a memorial statue of her outside the S.H.I.E.L.D. Academy in Newark. Steve Rogers, Nick Fury, and Dum Dum Dugan attended her funeral.

Through unknown means, Peggy Carter was revived and rejuvenated where she joined Sharon in forming the Daughters of Liberty under the alias of Dryad. Besides Sharon, the only other people who knew were Falcon and Winter Soldier. She assisted the group in working to clear Captain America's name when he was framed for the death of Thunderbolt Ross. Dryad fought Ross' real murder Foreigner until Crossbones and Sin fired a missile at them. Dryad survived while Foreigner presumably perishes. She secretly assists Winter Soldier into feeding false intel on Captain America's whereabouts to Nick Fury Jr. in order to throw him off. After getting some intel from Baron Strucker's mind, Peggy's location is stormed by Nick Fury Jr. and his men while Peggy was asking Sharon when she is going to tell Captain America about her revival. Peggy tells Nick Fury Jr. that he and his men will have to go through her first if they want to get to Captain America. Peggy subdues the soldiers and holds Nick Fury Jr. at gunpoint in order to straighten him out. Deciding it's time to let Steve know about her return, Peggy arranged for Daughters of Liberty teammate Agatha Harkness to bring Steve to her. She revealed to him that she has been tracking Aleksander Lukin ever since the event where Lukin and Selene took a soul fragment from Sharon. In addition, Peggy stated to Steve that Lukin was behind the death of Thunderbolt Ross, the attacks of the Watchdogs, and the new Scourge. Sharon, Falcon, and Winter Soldier enter while explaining why they kept Peggy's revival a secret. Peggy and Winter Soldier reveal to Steve that the soul fragment that manifested as a stone was used to revive Lukin which also revived the remnants of Red Skull's mind that is in him.

Abilities
Peggy Carter is shown to be a superb hand-to-hand combatant and martial artist, also excelling in using firearms. She is a highly trained spy, tactician, strategist, and commander.

As Dryad, Peggy wears a type of battle armor that is strong enough to protect her from a missile attack and keep her insulated when it is ablaze.

Other versions

Amalgam Comics
In Super-Soldier: Man of War #1 from Amalgam Comics, Mademoiselle Peggy is a cross between Peggy Carter and DC Comics' World War II version of Mademoiselle Marie.

Captain Carter
As a result of the success of the new Captain Carter from the What If...? animated series, Marvel introduced a similar character in the comic Captain Carter #1. It is set in its own universe, unrelated to the main Marvel universe or the MCU one. Captain Carter is cryogenically frozen from WWII up to the modern day, as in the usual origin story of Captain America, and discovers that HYDRA is still active.

Another Captain Carter, similar to the MCU character as well, appeared in Avengers Forever #4, a crossover involving the multiverse and many alternate versions of characters. She alongside Warbow and War Widow find Moon Knight and Vision from Earth-818 at the Center of Infinity and recruit them into Avenger Prime's army.

As the Multiversal Avengers and the Avengers of Earth-616 fight the Doctor Doom variants working for Doom Supreme, Captain America of Earth-616 fights alongside Captain Carter as she tells him to maintain the formation.

The concept of Peggy Carter serving as Captain America was created for the game Marvel Puzzle Quest for Captain America's 75th anniversary. She was adapted into the third series of the comic Exiles.

Exiles
In Exiles Vol. 3, the titular team is joined by a Peggy Carter who became the Captain America of her universe and a female version of Bucky Barnes named Becky Barnes.

House of M
In the alternate reality created by Scarlet Witch in the 2005 "House of M" storyline, Captain America is never frozen in the Arctic, and instead marries Peggy shortly after World War II ends.

Spider-Gwen
On Earth-65, Peggy Carter (designed after Hayley Atwell) is the long-lived director of S.H.I.E.L.D., much like Nick Fury in the primary universe. She also sports an eye patch similar to the one worn by Fury, later recruiting an amnesiac Manji, the Immortal Mr. Murderhands to work for her as an assassin.

In other media

Marvel Cinematic Universe

Peggy Carter appears in media set in the Marvel Cinematic Universe (MCU), portrayed by Hayley Atwell. This version is a British agent of the Strategic Scientific Reserve before co-founding S.H.I.E.L.D. with Howard Stark and becoming the aunt of Sharon Carter. She first appears in the live-action film Captain America: The First Avenger before making subsequent appearances in the live-action Marvel One-Shot Agent Carter, the live-action TV series Agent Carter and Agents of S.H.I.E.L.D., and the live-action films Captain America: The Winter Soldier, Avengers: Age of Ultron, and Ant-Man. While she does not appear in the live-action film Captain America: Civil War, she is stated to have died. Additionally, alternate timeline versions of Peggy appear in the live-action films Avengers: Endgame and Doctor Strange in the Multiverse of Madness (2022) as well as the Disney+ animated series What If...?

Television
 Peggy Carter appears in the "Captain America segment" of The Marvel Super Heroes, voiced by Peg Dixon.
 Peggy Carter, based on the MCU incarnation, appears in the Avengers Assemble episode "New Year's Resolution", voiced by Hayley Atwell.

Video games
 Peggy Carter, based on the MCU incarnation, appears in Captain America: Super Soldier, voiced again by Hayley Atwell.
 Peggy Carter appears in Lego Marvel's Avengers, voiced again by Hayley Atwell.
 Peggy Carter appears in Marvel Puzzle Quest.
 An alternate universe version of Carter who became Captain America also appears as a playable character.
 Peggy Carter as Captain America appears in Lego Marvel Super Heroes 2.

See also
 List of Marvel Comics superhero debuts

References

External links
 Peggy Carter at Marvel Database
 Margaret "Peggy" Carter  at the Comic Book DB
 Peggy Carter at Comic Vine

 
British superheroes
Characters created by Stan Lee
Characters created by Jack Kirby
Comics characters introduced in 1966
Fictional British Army officers
Fictional British secret agents
Fictional characters from Virginia
Fictional immigrants to the United States
Fictional Special Air Service personnel
Fictional female martial artists
Fictional female secret agents and spies
Fictional military strategists
Fictional spymasters
Fictional women soldiers and warriors
Fictional World War II veterans
Marvel Comics martial artists
Marvel Comics superheroes
Marvel Comics female superheroes
S.H.I.E.L.D. agents
United Kingdom-themed superheroes